Lungotevere degli Altoviti is the stretch of Lungotevere that connects Piazza di Ponte Sant'Angelo to Piazza Paquale Paoli, in Rome, in the rione Ponte. 

The Lungotevere is named after the noble Florentine Altoviti family, who moved into this area because it was a place populated by Tuscans. At first, it was called Lungotevere Elio.
For the construction of the Lungotevere it was demolished palace Altoviti, the residence of the family, built in 1514 and destroyed in 1888. Of the building, where in 1751 was born Ennio Quirino Visconti, was saved very little, including a ceiling currently placed in Palazzo Venezia.  

    
Altoviti
Streets in Rome R. V Ponte